The 2008–09 Turkish Basketball League was the 43rd season of the top professional basketball league in Turkey. Efes Pilsen won the championship.

Regular season standings 
Statistics correct as of June 19, 2009

Clubs and Arenas 

The league consists of the following member clubs:

Playoffs

External links 
 Turkish Basketball League Official Website
 Turkish Basketball Federation Official Website
 TBLStat.net 
  Turk Telekom Fans' site

References 

Turkish Basketball Super League seasons
Turkish
1